Arrayanaria is a genus of moths in the family Geometridae described by Parra in 1996.

Species
Arrayanaria duofasciata Parra, 1996
Arrayanaria santiaguensis Parra, 1996

References

Larentiinae
Geometridae genera